7 chili in 7 giorni (7 kilos in 7 days) is a 1986 Italian comedy film directed by .

Plot 
Silvano and Alfio are mediocre students who manage to snatch away a degree at the university where they both studied medicine with abysmal results. After a few years Silvano (now a peddler of beauty products who on the side sells pornographic material and sex toys) meets Alfio again, now running a beauty parlor fueled with the money of his neurotic wife. After a comic mishap with a customer left too long in a sauna machine who has apparently suffered a stroke Silvano, seeing the large country villa where Alfio lives with his family, proposes him to turn it into a dieting-farm where rich customers will pay hefty sums to get rid of excess fat. The operation is run haphazardly with several incidents; in the end Alfio suffers a nervous breakdown and goes catatonic. An English professor of Aesthetics (with which Alfio shares the room in the clinic he's recuperating at) convinces the duo that true beauty lies in generous proportions, as in the works of Tiziano, Giorgione and other famous artists. Alfio and Silvano then convert the villa in a trattoria where the best patrons are the same people who originally visited it for dieting purposes.

Cast 

 Renato Pozzetto: Silvano Baracchi
 Carlo Verdone: Alfio Tamburini
 : Samantha Tamburini
 Tiziana Pini: the beautiful lady
 Franco Diogene: Assessore Turri
 Elena Fabrizi: Sora Rosa
 : opera singer
 : Samantha's grandmother
 : younger brother of Samantha
 : older brother of Samantha
 Haruhiko Yamanouchi: the Chinese domestic
 Fiammetta Baralla: Tina, patient of the clinic

Reception
The film had 2.4 million admissions in Italy during 1987, the tenth most popular film of the year.

References

External links

1986 films
Italian comedy films
1986 comedy films
Films scored by Pino Donaggio
Medical-themed films
Films about food and drink
1986 directorial debut films
Films set in Rome
Films shot in Rome
1980s Italian films
1980s Italian-language films